Molecular magnet can refer to:
Molecule-based magnet, an unconventional magnetic material that consists of organic molecules, coordination compounds, or combinations
Single-molecule magnet, a single molecule that exhibits magnetic hysteresis of itself, without collective long-range ordering